Icheon Daekyo Women's Football Club was a South Korean women's football team based in Icheon, Gyeonggi-do. It was founded under the name Daekyo Kangaroos in November 2002 and was part of Daekyo Sports. Until 2017, the club competed in the WK League, the top division of women's football in South Korea. The team won the championship three times: in 2009, 2011 and 2012.

Icheon Daekyo ceased operations at the end of 2017.

Honours
WK League
Winners (3): 2009, 2011, 2012
Runners-up (3): 2014, 2015, 2016

Records

Year-by-year

References

Women's football clubs in South Korea
Association football clubs established in 2002
Sport in Gyeonggi Province
Icheon
WK League clubs
2002 establishments in South Korea
Association football clubs disestablished in 2017
Defunct football clubs in South Korea
2017 disestablishments in South Korea